The Southwest Air Defense Sector (SWADS) is an inactive United States Air Force organization.  Its last assignment was with the First Air Force, being stationed at March Air Force Base, California.  It was inactivated on 31 December 1994.

Los Angeles Air Defense Sector
The Los Angeles Air Defense Sector (SAGE) (LAADS) was designated by Air Defense Command in February 1959 while NORAD's July 25, 1958, SAGE Geographic Reorganization Plan was being implemented.  Assuming control of former ADC Western Air Defense Force units, the sector's region consisted of ADC atmospheric forces (fighter-interceptor and radar units) located in southern California north to Santa Barbara and the southern Central Valley.  The Manual Air Direction Center (MDC) was at Norton AFB, California, until the Air Defense Direction Center (DC-17) was completed in 1959 for the Semi Automatic Ground Environment.

On 1 April 1966, LAADS was inactivated, as did the other 22 sectors in the country. Most of its assets were assumed by the 27th Air Division.

Reactivated as the Southwest Air Defense Sector (SWADS) on 1 July 1987 at March AFB, California, in the 26th Air Division; the sector received the 26th AD assets when it became inactive on 30 September 1990.  SWADS was responsible for the atmospheric defense of approximately one-fourth of the Continental United States.  Its eastern border was at the intersection of the 36th parallel north and 97th meridian west south to the Gulf of Mexico at the 28th parallel north.  Its region extended west to include the region south of the 36th parallel north to the Pacific Ocean at the 122nd meridian west.  It came under the Continental NORAD Region (CONR) Headquarters at Tyndall AFB, Florida.  The Joint Surveillance System Sector Operations Control Center (SOCC) was at March AFB and Air Route Surveillance Radar (ARSR) data from several JSS radar stations and tethered aerostat radar balloons (e.g., Ground Equipment Facility J-31 near Los Angeles).

On 1 January 1995, the SWADS consolidated with the Northwest Air Defense Sector, headquartered at McChord AFB, Washington and the combined command was designated as the Western Air Defense Sector (WADS).

Units
Air National Guard units aligned under 1AF (AFNORTH) formerly with an air defense mission under SWADS were:
 144th Fighter Wing (F-16), California ANG, Fresno ANGB, California
 150th Fighter Wing (F-16), New Mexico ANG, Kirtland AFB, New Mexico
 138th Fighter Wing (F-16), Oklaholma ANG, Tulsa, Oklaholma
 149th Fighter Wing (F-16), Texas ANG, Lackland AFB, Texas

Lineage
 Established as  Los Angeles Air Defense Sector on 1 February 1959 by redesignation of 27th Air Division
 Inactivated on 1 April 1966; redesignated as 27th Air Division
 Redesignated as Southwest Air Defense Sector (SWADS) and activated, 1 July 1987
 Inactivated on 31 December 1994, assets reassigned to Northwest Air Defense Sector

Assignments
 28th Air Division, 1 October 1959 – 1 April 1966
 26th Air Division, 1 July 1987
 First Air Force, 1 October 1990 – 31 December 1994

Stations
 Norton AFB, California, 1 October 1959 – 1 April 1966
 March AFB, California, 1 July 1987 – 30 September 1990

Components

Group
 414th Fighter Group (Air Defense)
 Oxnard AFB, California, 1 October 1959 – 1 April 1966

Interceptor squadrons
 15th Fighter-Interceptor Squadron
 Davis-Monthan AFB, Arizona, 1 January 1960 – 1 May 1961 
 329th Fighter-Interceptor Squadron
 George AFB, California, 1 October 1959 – 1 April 1966 
 456th Fighter-Interceptor Squadron
 Castle AFB, California, 1 August 1963 – 1 April 1966

Radar squadrons
 612th Aircraft Control and Warning Squadron
 Ajo AFS, Arizona, 1 January 1960 – 1 May 1961
 669th Aircraft Control and Warning Squadron
 Santa Rosa Island AFS, California, 1 October 1959
 Lompoc AFS, California, 1 April 1963 – 1 April 1966
 682nd Aircraft Control and Warning Squadron
 Almaden AFS, California, 1 August 1963
 774th Aircraft Control and Warning Squadron
 Madera AFS, California, 1 August 1963 – 1 April 1966
 864th Aircraft Control and Warning Squadron
 Vincent AFB, Arizona, 1 October 1959 – 1 May 1961

See also
 Eastern Air Defense Sector
 List of MAJCOM wings of the United States Air Force
 List of United States Air Force Aerospace Defense Command Interceptor Squadrons
 Southeast Air Defense Sector
 United States general surveillance radar stations
 Western Air Defense Sector

References

  A Handbook of Aerospace Defense Organization  1946–1980,  by Lloyd H. Cornett and Mildred W. Johnson, Office of History, Aerospace Defense Center, Peterson Air Force Base, Colorado
 Winkler, David F. (1997), Searching the skies: the legacy of the United States Cold War defense radar program. Prepared for United States Air Force Headquarters Air Combat Command.}
 Maurer, Maurer (1983). Air Force Combat Units Of World War II. Maxwell AFB, Alabama: Office of Air Force History. .
 Ravenstein, Charles A. (1984). Air Force Combat Wings Lineage and Honors Histories 1947–1977. Maxwell AFB, Alabama: Office of Air Force History. .
 Radomes.org Los Angeles Air Defense Sector

Aerospace Defense Command units
Air Defense